Alexandru N. Ciurcu (29 January 1854, Şercaia – 22 January 1922, Bucharest) was a Romanian inventor and publisher, known for his invention with the French journalist  of a reaction engine. It used rocket propulsion and was briefly used to power a boat, demonstrated on 13 August 1886. The two men envisioned that such motors would later be used for air travel.

On 16 December 1886, during a test with a new second engine for the boat at Asnières, the engine exploded. Just Buisson and an assistant at the helm were killed. Ciurcu survived by swimming ashore, but at first was accused of murder.

Origin 
One of his cousins was the doctor Sterie N. Ciurcu, who obtained his doctorate in 1877 in Vienna and who worked in Vienna since 1886. A recognized militant for the national cause of the Romanians in the empire and editor of some Romanian magazines , was imprisoned by the Habsburg authorities in 1916, when Romania entered the war, and died in prison. He was decorated with the Order of the Crown (Romania).

Education 
Alexandru Ciurcu attended high school in Brașov, taking his baccalaureate in 1872. He studied law at the University of Vienna, between 1873 and 1876. In parallel, Alexandru Ciurcu also attended technical courses.

References 

Romanian inventors
Romanian scientists
1854 births
1922 deaths